Richard Mayhew (born 24 June 1985 in Auckland, New Zealand) is a rugby union player for Yorkshire Carnegie in the RFU Championship. He plays as a flanker or a number 8.

Mayhew started out playing rugby at local club Northcote, part of the North Harbour Rugby Union.  He first moved to England to join London Wasps in 2010, but the deal fell through.  Mayhew then played for National League 1 side, Esher before moving to Newcastle (alongside his brother Michael, who now plays for London Irish), making his debut against Bath on the first day of the 2011-12 season.

References

External links
Newcastle Falcons Profile

Living people
1985 births
New Zealand rugby union players
Newcastle Falcons players
Leeds Tykes players
Rugby union players from Auckland
Rugby union flankers
Rugby union number eights